Guardatele ma non toccatele is a 1959 Italian comedy film directed by Mario Mattoli and starring Ugo Tognazzi.

Cast
 Ugo Tognazzi - Maresciallo La Notte
 Caprice Chantal - Rebecca O'Connor
 Johnny Dorelli - Tenente Altieri
 Lynn Shaw - Un'ausiliara
 Bice Valori - Irma La Notte
 Corrado Pani - Claudio
 Liana Orfei - Un'ausiliaria
 Edy Vessel - ausiliaria americana bionda
 Raimondo Vianello - Il colonnello
 Fred Buscaglione - Himself
 Bruce Cabot - Il pilota americano DC-3
 Chelo Alonso - Pepita un'ausiliaria latino-americana
 Giacomo Furia - Addetto allo spaccio
 Rik Van Nutter - secondo pilota americano

External links

1959 films
1959 comedy films
1950s Italian-language films
Italian black-and-white films
Films directed by Mario Mattoli
Italian comedy films
1950s Italian films